The Maryland Department of Health is an agency of the government of Maryland responsible for public health issues. The Department is headed by a Secretary who is a member of the Executive Council/Cabinet of the Governor of Maryland. Currently the secretary is Laura Herrera Scott. Previous secretaries have included Dennis R. Schrader, Robert R. Neall, Joshua Sharfstein, and Georges C. Benjamin.

History
The Department was formed in 1969 as the Maryland Department of Health and Mental Hygiene and was known by this name until June 30, 2017. Although the department itself was formed in 1969, some of its origins go back to the seventeenth and eighteenth centuries. In January 2022, the department disclosed a ransomware cyberattack discovered in the previous month causing disruption in healthcare systems already stressed by the COVID-19 surge.

References

External links
 
 Department of Health, Maryland Manual On-Line

Health
State departments of health of the United States
Medical and health organizations based in Maryland
1969 establishments in Maryland